Robert D. McMurry Jr. is a retired United States Air Force Lieutenant General who is now an executive vice president at Dayton Aerospace and a member of its board of directors. In the U.S. Air Force, he last served as the Commander of the Air Force Life Cycle Management Center. Prior to that, he was the Commander of the Air Force Research Laboratory.

McMurry earned a B.S. degree in electrical engineering from the University of Texas at Austin in 1984. He later received an M.S. degree in control and systems engineering from the University of West Florida in 1993, an M.A. degree in national security and strategic studies from the College of Naval Command and Staff at the Naval War College in 1998 and an M.S. degree in strategic studies from the Air War College in 2002.

References

External links
 

Year of birth missing (living people)
Living people
Place of birth missing (living people)
Cockrell School of Engineering alumni
University of West Florida alumni
Naval War College alumni
Air War College alumni
United States Air Force generals